Eastside High School or East Side High School can refer to:

East Side High School (Cleveland, Mississippi)
Eastside High School (Coeburn, Virginia)
Eastside High School (Covington, Georgia)
Eastside High School (Gainesville, Florida)
Eastside High School (Lancaster, California)
Eastside High School (Sacramento, California)
Eastside High School (Madison, Wisconsin)
East Side High School (Newark, New Jersey)
Eastside High School (Paterson, New Jersey), highlighted in the 1989 film Lean on Me
Eastside High School (Taylors, South Carolina)
Eastside Junior-Senior High School (Butler, Indiana)